Björn Olgeirsson (born 23 February 1962) is an Icelandic alpine skier. He competed in two events at the 1980 Winter Olympics. At the 1980 Winter Olympics, he appeared in two competitions, but failed to finish both.

References

1962 births
Living people
Björn Olgeirsson
Björn Olgeirsson
Alpine skiers at the 1980 Winter Olympics
20th-century Icelandic people